Klaus Dibiasi (born 6 October 1947) is a former diver from Italy, who competed in four consecutive Summer Olympics for his country, starting in 1964. He dominated the platform event from the late 1960s to the mid-1970s, winning a total number of three Olympic gold medals.

Biography
Dibiasi won a silver medal in platform diving at the 1964 Summer Olympics, and went on to win gold in the same event at the next three Games (1968, 1972, and 1976). Dibiasi is the only Olympic diver to have won three successive gold medals, and he is the only diver to have won medals at four Summer Olympics. (Greg Louganis, who won silver at his first Olympics in 1976, was prevented from attempting to replicate either feat by the 1980 Summer Olympics boycott.) A silver in the springboard in 1968 gave him a record total of five Olympic medals. He also excelled at the first two FINA World Aquatic Championships (1973 and 1975), winning four medals. Nationally Dibiasi won 11 platform and 7 springboard titles.

Dibiasi was born in Solbad Hall, Austria, from Italian parents who returned to Italy when he was a child. He was the first Italian to become an Olympic champion in a diving event. Dibiasi was coached by his father, Carlo, a former Italian champion (1933–1936) and a competitor at the 1936 Summer Olympics in Berlin, who finished 10th on the platform. Klaus Dibiasi also later coached the Italian diving team.

Awards

See also
 List of members of the International Swimming Hall of Fame
List of multiple Olympic gold medalists
List of multiple Olympic gold medalists in one event
List of multiple Olympic medalists in one event
List of flag bearers for Italy at the Olympics
Italian men gold medalist at the Olympics and World Championships

References

External links
 

1947 births
Living people
Italian male divers
Olympic divers of Italy
Olympic gold medalists for Italy
Olympic silver medalists for Italy
Divers at the 1964 Summer Olympics
Divers at the 1968 Summer Olympics
Divers at the 1972 Summer Olympics
Divers at the 1976 Summer Olympics
Olympic medalists in diving
Medalists at the 1976 Summer Olympics
Medalists at the 1972 Summer Olympics
Medalists at the 1968 Summer Olympics
Medalists at the 1964 Summer Olympics
World Aquatics Championships medalists in diving
Universiade medalists in diving
Universiade gold medalists for Italy
Medalists at the 1970 Summer Universiade
20th-century Italian people
21st-century Italian people